Pennsylvania gained three seats in reapportionment following the 1820 United States Census. Pennsylvania elected its members October 8, 1822.

See also 
 1822 Pennsylvania's 1st congressional district special election
 1822 Pennsylvania's 6th congressional district special election
 1822 Pennsylvania's 7th congressional district special election
 1822 Pennsylvania's 14th congressional district special election
 1822 and 1823 United States House of Representatives elections
 List of United States representatives from Pennsylvania

Notes

References 

1822
Pennsylvania
United States House of Representatives